Them Changes is a live album by pianist Ramsey Lewis which was recorded in Minneapolis in 1970 and released on the Cadet label.

Reception

Allmusic awarded the album 2 stars.

Track listing
All compositions by Ramsey Lewis except as indicated
 "Them Changes" (Buddy Miles) - 6:40   
 "Drown in My Own Tears" (Henry Glover) - 7:25   
 "Oh Happy Day" (Edwin Hawkins) - 7:10   
 "Do Whatever Sets You Free" - 7:53   
 "Something" (George Harrison) - 5:15   
 "See the End from the Beginning, Look Afar" (Lewis, Cleveland Eaton)  6:15   
 "The Unsilent Minority" - 3:45

Personnel 
Ramsey Lewis - piano, electric piano
Phil Upchurch - electric guitar
Cleveland Eaton - electric bass
Morris Jennings  - drums

References 

 
1970 live albums
Ramsey Lewis live albums
Cadet Records live albums